Pope Shenouda III (  ;  ; 3 August 1923 – 17 March 2012) was the 117th Pope of Alexandria and Patriarch of the See of St. Mark the evangelist and apostle. His papacy lasted 40 years, 4 months, and 4 days from 14 November 1971 until his death.

His official title was Pope of Alexandria and the Patriarch of All Africa on the Holy Apostolic Throne of Saint Mark the Evangelist, Father of fathers, Shepherd of shepherds, Successor of Saint Mark, thirteenth among the Apostles, Ecumenical Judge, Beloved of Christ. He was also the head of the Holy Synod of the Coptic Orthodox Church. He was a conservative figure within the church and was also respected within the Muslim community.

He became a monk in 1954 under the name Father Antonios the Syrian after joining the Syrian Monastery of the Ever-Virgin Mary the Theotokos. In 1958, he was elevated to the priesthood. In 1962, Pope Cyril VI summoned Fr. Antonios and consecrated him General Bishop for Christian Education and as Dean of the Coptic Orthodox Theological Seminary, whereupon he assumed the papal name Shenouda, which was the name of the Coptic saint Shenoute the Archimandrite (lived 347/348–465/466), as well as two previous popes: Shenouda I (Papacy 859–880) and Shenouda II.

Following the death of Pope Cyril VI on 9 March 1971, the selection process resulted in Bishop Shenouda's becoming the new Pope. He was consecrated on 14 November 1971. During his papacy, the Coptic church grew significantly. He appointed the first bishops for North American dioceses, which now contain more than 250 parishes (214 in the United States, 38 in Canada and one in Mexico), up from four in 1971. He also appointed the first Coptic bishops in Europe, Australia and South America. Within Egypt, he struggled for the welfare of his people and the church. Pope Shenouda III was known for his commitment to ecumenism and advocated inter-denominational Christian dialogue. He devoted his writings, teachings and actions to spreading and propagating guidelines for understanding, peace, dialogue and forgiveness.

At the time of his death, Pope Shenouda III was viewed as one of the Great Patriarchs of the ancient Church of Alexandria, a well-known church father and teacher, a chief defender of the faith, and a noted Egyptian leader of the 20th and 21st centuries. He was given the title ‘Teacher of Generations’ for his great talent at relaying complicated theological and other religious concepts in a simple, understandable and deeply spiritual manner.

Early life 

Shenouda III was born as Nazir Gayed Roufail in the village of Salaam, which administratively belongs to the Governorate of Asyut in Upper Egypt but ecclesiastically belongs to the Diocese of Manfalut. He was the youngest of a family of eight children, five girls and three boys – among whom were Raphael (Rouphael) and Shawki (Fr. Botros Gayed, 1918–1996). Nazir's mother died shortly after his birth. He was raised by his older brother, Raphael, in Damanhur in lower Egypt, where he attended a Coptic Elementary School. Soon after, he studied at the American Middle School in Banha. He then moved to Shubra, a suburb of Cairo, where he enrolled at the Faith Senior Secondary (high school).

From the age of 14, Nazir began reading poetry and he wrote many poems himself, especially between 1946 and 1962. By the age of 16, he was active in the Coptic Sunday School movement. He served as a Sunday School teacher, first at Saint Anthony's Church in Shoubra and then at Saint Mary's Church in Mahmasha.

In 1943, Nazir enrolled in Cairo University (then called the University of King Fouad I) studying towards a Bachelor of Arts (B. A.) degree, majoring in English and History. Meanwhile, he spent his summer vacations at the Western Desert Monastery of St. Mary, known as "Deir El-Suryan" (Syrian Monastery). While a university student, he was a trainee in the Egyptian Military Reserve Corps.

In 1946, while still in his final year of undergraduate studies, he was allowed to enroll in the evening classes at the Coptic Theological Seminary usually open only to University graduates but the dean of the Seminary, Archdeacon Habib Girgis (d. 1951), made an exception in the case of Nazir. The personality of Habib Girgis was instrumental in shaping that of the future Pope, and Pope Shenouda always spoke highly of Habib Girgis.

Nazir graduated from Cairo University with a BA in History in 1947. After graduation, he completed his military service as dux (top of group), and began work as a teacher of English, History and Social Sciences in a high school in Cairo. Meanwhile, he attended graduate courses in Archaeology and Classics at Cairo University specializing in the History of Ancient Egypt and Islamic Egypt. He worked as a high school English and Social Studies teacher by day, and attended classes at the Coptic Theological Seminary by night. Upon graduation from the seminary in 1949, he was appointed to teach New Testament and Old Testament Studies at the Seminary.. In the same year, he became the Editor-in-Chief of the Sunday School Monthly Magazine. In 1950 Nazir resigned from secular employment to take up a full-time lecturing position at the Seminary.

In 1952 he was elected member of the Egyptian Journal Syndicate. In 1953, he was appointed a lecturer at the Monastic College in Helwan, offering courses in Theology there, and in the same year he began his dialogue with Jehovah's Witnesses, writing articles about their beliefs in the Sunday School Magazine.

Nazir with others laboured for several years to establish a strong Sunday School and youth group at St Anthony's Church in Shubra. His ministry produced many devoted servants, who began establishing youth groups in neighbouring parishes.

An avid reader, he was a keen student of languages and a man of vast ecumenical insights. He spoke fluent Arabic (Standard, Egyptian and Sa'idi variants), spoke fluent English and French, read Greek (both Ancient and Modern variants) and Latin, and also mastered the Amharic language.

Monastic life and educational service 

On 18 July 1954, Nazir joined the monastic life at the Syrian Monastery of the Ever-Virgin Mary the Theotokos in Scetes in the Nitrian Desert (Western desert in Egypt). He was given the name of Father Antonios el-Syriani (Anthony the Syrian). From 1956 to 1962, he lived as a hermit in a cave about seven miles from the monastery, dedicating his time to meditation, prayer, and asceticism. His austerity was known to be exceptional even by monastic standards.

On 31 August 1958, he was ordained as priest by Bishop Theophilus, then abbot of St Mary Monastery (Syrian Monastery).

Antonios el-Syriani was among the candidates nominated for the papal throne in 1959, but Father Mina el-Baramosy became Pope Cyril VI.

Bishop 
On 30 September 1962, Pope Cyril VI appointed him to the bishopric of Christian Education and as Dean of the Coptic Orthodox Theological Seminary, and renamed him Shenouda in honour of the most renowned scholar and writer in Coptic, Saint Shenouda the Archimandrite (lived 347/348–465/466).

Under Bishop Shenouda's leadership, the number of students at the Coptic Orthodox Theological Seminary tripled. Bishop Shenouda was suspended in 1966 by Pope Cyril VI, essentially because of "campaigns for change" instigated by Shenouda and his students. These campaigns, among other things, called for popular election of bishops and priests, a principle that Bishop Shenouda later applied when he became Pope of Alexandria. This conflict between Pope Cyril VI and Bishop Shenouda was later resolved.

Pope and Patriarch 

He was enthroned as Pope Shenouda III, the 117th Pope of Alexandria and patriarch of the See of St. Mark on 14 November 1971, nearly nine months after the death of Pope Cyril VI of Alexandria. The ceremony was the first enthroning of a Coptic Pope to take place in the new Saint Mark's Coptic Orthodox Cathedral in Cairo. He was the third Alexandrian Patriarch to take the name Shenouda; his namesakes were Shenouda I (859–880) and Shenouda II (1047–1077).

Less than one year after becoming Pope of the Church of Alexandria, in October 1972, Pope Shenouda visited the Ecumenical Patriarch of Constantinople and the Pope of Rome, becoming the first Alexandrian Pope to do so since the Christological schism of the Council of Chalcedon in 451 CE. In May 1973, he penned a Christological statement that was agreed upon with the Roman Catholic Church and the Oriental and Eastern Orthodox Churches on the Nature of Christ, in a step towards settling the dispute of 451 and moving towards Christian unity. On 10 May 1973, he celebrated the return by the Roman Catholic Church of part of the relics of Pope Athanasius of Alexandria. From 25 to 30 September 1974, he went on a pastoral trip to visit the Ethiopian Church during the reign of Emperor Haile Selassie of Ethiopia.

Between 14 April and 23 May 1974, he became the first Pope of Alexandria to visit North America when he visited the US and Canada. It was to become the first of many visits to that part of the world during his long Papacy. He also visited Australia six times. The first visit was in 1989 (18 November – 10 December), the second was in 1991 (5–26 February), the third in 1993, the fourth in 1995 (August–September), and the fifth in 1996. His sixth and final trip took place in November 2002. He conducted an extended Silver Jubilee tour from 18 May to 20 December 1996 which took him to Europe, Canada, USA and Australia. From 11 to 13 April 2008, he made a second historical trip to Ethiopia following the resolution of the strain in the relationship between the two churches caused by the communist coup in Ethiopia decades earlier.

Political stances

Falling out with President Sadat 
Ten years into his papacy, in 1981, Pope Shenouda III had famously fallen out with President Anwar Sadat of Egypt. The relationship between the two men deteriorated for several reasons.
 Since coming to power, President Sadat had started encouraging the growth of Islamism in the country as means to fight communist groups and solidify his own power. During the term of office of Sadat's predecessor, Gamal Abdul Nasser, Islamic groups such as the Muslim Brotherhood had been suppressed.
 Sadat had also pushed forward a constitutional amendment that would have allowed him to stand for re-election as president more than twice. To make the constitutional amendment more appealing to the populace, Sadat bundled it with another constitutional amendment declaring Islamic Sharia law the main source of legislation, an action viewed as a step towards a more radically Islamic Egypt.
 Under Sadat, the Government released a census in 1977 that understated the number of Christians even contradicting earlier released censuses.
 The years from 1972 to 1981 saw an escalation of violence against the Christians of Egypt culminating in a massacre of Christians in a poor district of Cairo in 1981.
 Pope Shenouda was of the opinion that Sadat's peace treaty with Israel was ill-timed and should have been part of a larger comprehensive peace in the Middle East.

Sadat was seen by Pope Shenouda as becoming increasingly dictatorial following his acclaim in the international arena for the peace accord with Israel. In September 1981 Sadat rescinded the presidential decree of 1971 recognizing Pope Shenouda as Pope of Alexandria, and Pope Shenouda was banished by Sadat to an ancient desert monastery. However, the Christians of Egypt continued to view Pope Shenouda as their Pope and only leader, and he continued to conduct his duties from his desert monastery: ecclesiastically, Sadat's decision was ineffective. Sadat was assassinated a month later, on 6 October 1981, by Islamic extremists, and in January 1985 Pope Shenouda III was fully reinstated by Sadat's successor, Hosni Mubarak.

Israel 
Pope Shenouda III had arguments with then President Anwar Sadat over both the Camp David Accords and what he said was the president's deficient response to growing Islamism. After a series of protests that led president Sadat to depose Pope Shenouda III, he was exiled by Sadat and sent to the Nitrian Desert, to return three years after Sadat's assassination following an amnesty by Sadat's successor Hosni Mubarak.

His stance toward Israel was encapsulated by his words:
From the Arabic national point we should not abandon our Palestinian brothers and our Arabic brothers by normalising our relations with the Jews ... From the church point of view, Copts who go to Jerusalem betray their church in the case of "Al-Sultan Monastery" that Israel refuses to give to the Copts.

He also warned that Copts who visited Jerusalem would face excommunication on the premise that there was "no pilgrimage duty in Christianity and it is not a religious pillar, so since this visit can do harm to our national cause and [to the] Muslim and Christian people then we better not visit Jerusalem." He added that Copts should only go to Jerusalem after peace was established in the region. Some of the Coptic property within the compound of the Church of the Holy Sepulchre (including the Coptic monastery known as Deir El-Sultan) was delegated to the Ethiopian Orthodox Church. Upon the application of some bishops, the Coptic Orthodox Holy Synod, based on the direction of Pope Shenouda III, also decided to ask Copts not to visit Jerusalem until the church possessions and the monastery be returned. In 2006, the Holy Synod renewed the decree, urging Copts not to visit the Christian holy places in Israel, including Jerusalem.

Suicide bombers 
In the light of the September 11 attacks, he said of suicide bombing as a tactic that:
People who support and found reasons to feel good over these incidents are doing more than one wrong thing: first, ignoring the tragedy of killing an innocent group of people. Second, not thinking about the reaction of showing they found satisfaction in the incidents. Third, they are considered accomplices in the crime. Fourth, they are committing a wrongful act not approved by religion.

Persecution of Christianity in Egypt in his time 

Persecution against Christians during Pope Shenouda III's reign was chiefly conducted by private individuals and organizations, especially radical Salafis, although the state continued to enforce long-standing discriminatory policies and engage in occasional Christian-baiting. Particularly in Upper Egypt, the rise in extremist Salafi groups such as the Gama'at Islamiya during the 1980s was accompanied by attacks on Copts and on Coptic churches. The police have been accused of siding with the attackers in some of these cases.

Hundreds of Christian Coptic girls have been kidnapped and forcibly converted to Islam, as well as being victims of rape and forced marriage to Muslim men.

On Sunday, 2 January 2000, 21 Coptic Christians in Kosheh village in Upper (southern) Egypt, 450 kilometers south of Cairo, were massacred by Salafists. Christian properties were also burned.. Later, a criminal court in Sohag governorate released all 89 defendants charged in the New Year's massacre in Kosheh without bail. Pope Shenouda III rejected the verdict openly, and told reporters, "We want to challenge this ruling. We don't accept it." As the court sentence could not be appealed, Pope Shenouda III said: "We will appeal this sentence before God."

In April 2006, one person was killed and twelve injured in simultaneous knife attacks on three Coptic churches in Alexandria.

In November 2008, several thousand Muslims attacked a Coptic church in a suburb of Cairo on the day of its inauguration, forcing 800 Coptic Christians to barricade themselves in.

In April 2009, two Christian men were shot dead and another was injured by Muslim men after an Easter vigil in the south of Egypt.

On 18 September 2009, a Muslim man named Osama Araban beheaded a Coptic Christian man in the village of Bagour, and injured 2 others in 2 different villages. He was arrested the following day.

On the eve of 7 January 2010, as worshippers were leaving the Mar-Yuhanna (St. John) church in Nag Hammadi after Eastern Christmas Mass (which finishes around midnight), three Muslim men in a car opened fire, killing 8 Christians and injuring another 10.

On New Year's Day 2011, just 20 minutes after midnight as Christians were leaving a Coptic Orthodox Church in the city of Alexandria after a New Year's Eve service a car bomb exploded in front of the church killing more than 23 and injuring more than 75.

On 7 May 2011, an armed group of Islamists, including Salafists, attacked and set fire to two churches including Saint Menas Coptic Orthodox Christian Church and the Coptic Church of the Holy Virgin, in Cairo. The attacks resulted in the deaths of 12 people and more than 230 wounded. It is reported that the events were triggered by a mixed marriage between a Christian woman and a Muslim man.

Successive Egyptian governments have long held in place laws that hampered the freedom of Christian worship and restricted the right to build or even renovate churches. They maintained and enforced an Ottoman era Hamayouni Decree restrictions on building or repairing churches. These governments also restricted Christians from senior government, diplomatic, military, and educational positions, and there has been increasing discrimination in the private sector. The government allowed various media outlets to attack Christianity and restricted Christians access to the state-controlled media to defend themselves or speak their minds.

Security agencies sporadically persecuted Muslim converts to Christianity. In Egypt the government does not officially recognize conversions from Islam to Christianity; because certain interfaith marriages are not allowed either, this prevents marriages between converts to Christianity and those born in Christian communities, and also results in the children of Christian converts being classified as Muslims and given a Muslim education.

Church growth 

The papacy of Pope Shenouda III saw an expansion of the Coptic Orthodox Church in North America. While there were only four Coptic Orthodox churches in all of North America in 1971, today there are more than two hundred. Pope Shenouda established the first Diocese in the lands of immigration for the Coptic Orthodox Patriarchate in 1991, the Diocese of Birmingham; and appointed the general bishop for the United Kingdom at the time, Bishop Missael to oversee it by consecrating and enthroning him as its bishop.

Relations with other churches 
Pope Shenouda III was well known for his commitment to ecumenism. In 1973, Pope Shenouda III became the first Coptic Orthodox Pope of Alexandria to meet the Bishop of Rome in over 1500 years. In this visit, Pope Shenouda III and Pope Paul VI signed a common declaration on the issue of Christology and agreed to further discussions on Christianity. There were also dialogues with various Protestant churches worldwide.

In an address he gave at an ecumenical forum during the International Week of Prayer in 1974, he declared, "The whole Christian world is anxious to see the church unite. Christian people, being fed up with divisions, are pushing their church leaders to do something about church unity and I am sure that the Holy Spirit is inspiring us."

Ethiopian Church conflict 
Following the arrest and imprisonment of Abune Tewophilos, Patriarch of Ethiopia, by the Stalinist Derg regime that had deposed Emperor Haile Selassie in 1974, Pope Shenouda III refused to recognise Abune Takla Haymanot, who was installed as Tewophilos' successor. He, along with the Holy Synod, argued that the removal of Patriarch Abune Tewophilos was illegal and contrary to canon law, as it was an act of political interference. In the eyes of the Church of Alexandria, Abune Tewophilos remained the legitimate Patriarch of Ethiopia.

Though Patriarch Tewophilos was said to have been executed, the government of Ethiopia did not acknowledge that this had happened. Thus, the Coptic Orthodox Church of Alexandria refused to recognise any other Patriarch as long as Abune Tewophilos' death had not been confirmed. Formal ties between the Coptics Church and Ethiopia were then severed, although they remained in full communion. Formal relations between the two churches resumed on 13 July 2007.

Theological disputes 
Pope Shenouda III was involved in theological disagreements concerning the issue of theosis—the transforming effect of divine grace. He published eight booklets explaining his view of theosis and lectured on the issue in the theological seminary of Cairo and also in the seminary of Alexandria. Following the death of Father Matta El Meskeen, who held an opposing view, Pope Shenouda III issued warnings against those views. In addition to his dispute with Fr. Matta El Meskeen, Shenouda got into theological disputes with Hany Mina Mikhail, George Habib Bebawi—whom he infamously excommunicated—and Henein Abd El Messih.

Illness and death 

In the months prior to Pope Shenouda's death, rumours which were denied by the Holy Synod had spread through Cairo's Coptic community that he had fallen into a coma. He regularly flew to the United States for medical treatment and, according to his doctor he "[suffered] from kidney disease and diabetes."

Pope Shenouda III died on 17 March 2012 (8 Paremhat 1728 in the Coptic calendar) of lung and liver complications at his official residence shortly after returning from medical treatment abroad. He had stopped taking medication because he was too weak. However, Al Jazeera English's Coptic Egyptian reporter Sherine Tadros reported that he had been in good spirits prior to his death. The funeral took place after three days of lying in state; on 20 March, he was buried at the Monastery of Saint Pishoy in Wadi el-Natrun, in accordance with his wishes. Metropolitan Pachomious of Beheira and Pentapolis was appointed to take over papal duties until the election of a new Pope, being the second-most senior Metropolitan in the Holy Synod in age after Anba Mikhail, but due to his failing health and age delegated this duty to Metropolitan Pachomios during the first meeting of the Holy Synod after Shenouda's death.

Domestic reactions 
During the night, an estimated one million or more mourners were said to have visited his body at St. Mark's Cathedral, causing traffic jams stretching for kilometres. The body was taken out of the coffin and lay in a seated position on a ceremonial throne dressed in gold- and red-embroidered vestments, a golden mitre upon his head with a gold-tipped staff in his hand. Many Coptic figures from across the world started to return to the country to pay their respects and work towards the selection of a new pope. Mourners from across Egypt went to Saint Mark Cathedral in Abbaseya to pay their respects. Bells tolled in Cairo's Abbasiya district, where the primary cathedral of the Coptic Church is located. So large was the crowd of mourners gathering in Cathedral Square to pay their respects that three were killed and 137 injured in a crush as the queue to view the body of the deceased pope stretched for more than one kilometer. Viewing was cut short after the tragedy, and the cathedral was closed to the public.

Political and religious reactions to his death came from across the Egyptian spectrum and internationally. The Supreme Council of the Armed Forces issued a statement on Facebook that expressed their wish of "preserving the unity of Egypt and the unity of its social fabric". It added that with the loss, the country should "consolidate with each other in order to pass with Egypt towards security and stability." Its leader, Field Marshal Mohamed Hussein Tantawi, decreed three days of mourning for Christians working for state institutions. The Muslim Brotherhood's Freedom and Justice Party's Speaker of Parliament Saad Katatni said of Shenouda's death that Egypt had lost "one of its national icons, a man who left a void in the political arena at a critical time." The party also issued a statement signed by the party's chairman Mohamed Morsi that stated Shenouda's life was "a long journey of big contribution in various fields domestically and abroad." Prime Minister Kamal el-Ganzouri's statement read: "I give my sincere condolences to the Coptic brothers home and abroad. [He was a] national character and a symbol for patriotism and he gained wide respect and appreciation from the Egyptian people." Former Prime Minister Essam Sharaf called Shenouda a "devout clergyman, a good citizen and a valuable leader. ... His vision was always that Egypt is not the country that we live in; but the country that lives in us." Upcoming presidential candidates also issued statements. Ahmed Shafiq said that his death was a loss to Egypt because he was a "unique religious leader and a distinguished character in the national history. Coptic church will pass this hard moment because of the great legacy of Pope Shenouda;" Amr Moussa said that Pope Shenouda III was "a great man who was working for the interests of the country. He was working for Egypt to stand as a unified front against the challenges facing the nation;" and Abdel Moneim Aboul Fotouh's campaign issued a statement saying that Fotouh had spoken with the church's bishop for youth, Bishop Moussa, to express his condolences to both the Coptic Church and Copts. Al-Nour Party's Members of Parliament walked out when a minute's silence was held for Shenouda, with a party spokesman saying that "a minute of silence does not exist in Islam."

Sheikh Ahmed el-Tayeb, the grand imam of al-Azhar University, said that "Egypt has lost one of its rare men at a sensitive moment when it most needs the wisest of its wise – their expertise and their purity of minds;" he also added that he "greatly remembers his vision towards Jerusalem and its history." Social media was said to be abuzz with memorials as well as criticism of Shenouda.

International reactions
  Holy See – In a message of condolence to Copts, the Roman Catholic Pope Benedict XVI said: "I recall with gratitude his commitment to Christian Unity, his memorable visit to my predecessor Pope Paul VI, and their signing of the Joint Declaration of Faith in the Incarnation of the Son of God together in Rome, on 10 May 1973, as well as his Cairo meeting with Pope John Paul II during the Great Jubilee of the Incarnation, on 24 February 2000. I can say how the Catholic Church as a whole shares the grief that afflicts the Orthodox Copts, and how she stands in fervent prayer asking that He, who is the Resurrection and the Life, might welcome his faithful servant." He offered prayers for the thrice blessed Pope Shenouda on the day of his death and was said to share the pain of Copts over Pope Shenouda's repose.
Director of the Holy See Press Office Federico Lombardi said that Benedict XVI desired that "the Lord welcomes this great pastor" and added that "we will never forget the meeting between Pope Shenouda III and Pope John Paul II in Cairo on the occasion of his pilgrimage to Mount Sinai [in 2000]..." A statement attributed to him read: "The Catholic Church shares in the grief and prayers of Coptic Christians in mourning the loss of their spiritual leader...May the Lord welcome this great shepherd and give him the reward he deserves for his service."
  Iran – Deputy Foreign Minister Hossein Amir-Abdollahian praised Shenouda for "constructive and lasting efforts to achieve peace and justice" and offered his condolences to the Coptic Orthodox Church and Copts.
  United States of America – President Barack Obama said of Shenouda that "we will remember Pope Shenouda III as a man of deep faith, a leader of a great faith, and an advocate for unity and reconciliation...a beloved leader of Egypt's Coptic Christians and an advocate for tolerance and religious dialogue." He also added that "Michelle and I are saddened to learn of the passing of Coptic Christian Pope Shenouda III, a beloved leader of Egypt's Coptic Christians and an advocate for tolerance and religious dialogue. We stand alongside Coptic Christians and Egyptians as they honor his contributions in support of peace and cooperation. [His] commitment to Egypt's national unity is also a testament to what can be accomplished when people of all religions and creeds work together."
Secretary of State Hillary Clinton expressed her condolences on behalf of the United States to the Egyptian people and said: "As we reflect on his life and legacy, we reaffirm our support to the future peace and prosperity of Egypt. Our thoughts and prayers are with the Egyptian people and all those who mourn Pope Shenouda III."
  Armenia – Foreign Minister Eduard Nalbandyan visited the Egyptian Embassy in Armenia on Thursday in order to extend condolences on the death of Pope Shenouda III, the spiritual leader of Egypt's Coptic Christians. Karekin II, Catholicos of the All Armenians and Aram I, Catholicos of the Great House of Cilicia offered condolences on the passing of Pope Shenouda III the leader of Coptic Orthodox Christians. Both Armenian church leaders sent a delegation to Pope Shenouda's funeral. Both Karekin II and Aram I praised Shenouda for his leadership of the Coptic Church and his unequivocal ability to work with all denominations to promote Christian unity.
  United Kingdom – The Foreign, Commonwealth and Development Office published a text citing William Hague saying, that Pope Shenouda III will be remembered "as a man of great wisdom, an advocate of dialogue and tolerance, and a symbol of national unity and reconciliation."

Books by Pope Shenouda III 

 * Translated into English

Awards 
In 2000, Pope Shenouda III was awarded the UNESCO-Madanjeet Singh Prize for the Promotion of Tolerance and Non-Violence by UNESCO Director-General Koichiro Matsuura on the recommendation of an international jury. The award was "for promoting exchange and understanding between Christianity and Islam in today's Middle East and his deep concern to pursue dialogue with all the great religious faiths and his major role in forging ecumenical links with all other members of the Christian family throughout the planet." In 2003 he received the Al-Gaddafi International Prize for Human Rights.

Honorary degrees 
 University of Bonn
 North Park University
 University of Toledo
 University of Michigan
 Eötvös Loránd University
 Saint Peter's University
 Saint Vincent College
 Bloomfield College

Honours

See also 

 List of Copts
 List of Egyptians

References

External links 

 Official website
 Pope Shenouda III – Coptic Orthodox Church Network: Biography, Online Books, and Audio Sermons
 Pope Shenouda III (1923–2012) — Archive of Contemporary Coptic Orthodox Theology (St Cyril's Coptic Orthodox College)
 Some Articles by Pope Shenouda III in English 
 More information about the life of Pope Shenouda III – from Saint Takla Haymanout the Ethiopian Church, Alexandria, Egypt
 Common declaration of Pope Shenouda III and Pope Paul VI (1973)
 Pope Shenouda III's story and life in Arabic and English
 Pope Shenouda III's Life 

1923 births
2012 deaths
People from Asyut Governorate
Cairo University alumni
Deans of the Catechetical School of Alexandria
Egyptian Christian monks
Oriental Orthodox monks
Christian Peace Conference members
20th-century Coptic Orthodox popes of Alexandria
21st-century Coptic Orthodox popes of Alexandria
Recipients of orders, decorations, and medals of Sudan
Recipients of orders, decorations, and medals of Ethiopia